Alexandru Cornea (1490 – 5 March 1541), known as the Evil and scarcely numbered Alexandru III, was the Prince of Moldavia from 1540 to 1541, from the House of Bogdan-Muşat. He succeeded to the throne as son of a previous ruler, Bogdan III cel Chior.

References

Further reading
Gorovei, Ştefan S.: Domnia lui Alexandru Cornea. [Die Herrschaft von Alexandru Cornea.]

1490 births
1541 deaths
15th-century Romanian people
16th-century Romanian people
16th-century monarchs in Europe
16th-century executions
Executed monarchs
House of Bogdan-Mușat
Rulers of Moldavia